Brent Burge is a sound editor. Burge was nominated for an Academy Award for Best Sound Editing for the 2013 film The Hobbit: The Desolation of Smaug with fellow sound editor Chris Ward and for the 2014 film The Hobbit: The Battle of the Five Armies with fellow sound editor Jason Canovas.

References

External links

Sound editors
Living people
Year of birth missing (living people)
Place of birth missing (living people)
Primetime Emmy Award winners